is a Japanese speed skater. He competed in the men's 500 metres event at the 2002 Winter Olympics.

References

External links
 

1975 births
Living people
Japanese male speed skaters
Olympic speed skaters of Japan
Speed skaters at the 2002 Winter Olympics
Sportspeople from Tochigi Prefecture
Speed skaters at the 1996 Asian Winter Games
20th-century Japanese people
21st-century Japanese people